Hafizul Ansari is the current Cabinet Minister in Government of Jharkhand and MLA from Madhupur, Jharkhand. He is the son of Haji Hussain Ansari, Former Cabinet Minister in same Cabinet. He belongs to the Jharkhand Mukti Morcha party.

References

Jharkhand politicians
Jharkhand Mukti Morcha politicians
State cabinet ministers of Jharkhand
Year of birth missing (living people)
Living people